Spirit prison may refer to:

 Spirits in prison, one of several Christian concepts about the afterlife 
 Spirit prison is a place in the spirit world where nonbelievers may become believers, according to Latter Day Saints beliefs